Meiling or Mei Ling may refer to:

Industry
 Hefei Meiling, Chinese home appliance manufacturer

Places in China
 Meiling Mountains, the former name of the Dayu Mountains, a mountain range in China 
 Meiling, Zhao'an County, a town in Zhao'an County, Fujian
 Meiling, Jiangxi, a town in Nanchang, Jiangxi
 Meiling Subdistrict, Jinjiang, a subdistrict of Jinjiang, Fujian
 Meiling Subdistrict, Yangzhou, a subdistrict of Hanjiang District, Yangzhou, Jiangsu

Names
 Meiling (given name), a feminine Chinese given name
 Connie Meiling (born 1930), Danish child actress of the 1930s
 Marc Meiling (born 1962), German judoka
 Hong Meiling, a Touhou character and Scarlet Devil Mansion guard

See also
 Meilin (disambiguation)
 Melling (disambiguation)